Monah Elahmad is an Australian former professional rugby league footballer who represented Lebanon at the 2000 Rugby League World Cup.

Background
Elahmad was born in Sydney, New South Wales, Australia.

Playing career
While playing for the Cabramatta Two Blues, Elahmad represented Lebanon at the 2000 World Cup, playing in two matches.

In 2001 he played his only National Rugby League match, playing for the Sydney Roosters.

In 2002 he moved clubs, joining the Parramatta Eels. At the end of the year he again represented Lebanon, playing in a match against France. He was released by Parramtta at the end of the season.

He played for Lebanon at the 2003 World Sevens and trialled for the South Sydney Rabbitohs. However he ended up spending the season with the Newtown Jets.

As of 2012 Elahmad played for the Auburn Warriors in the Bundaberg Red Cup.

References

1977 births
Australian rugby league players
Australian people of Lebanese descent
Sportspeople of Lebanese descent
Lebanon national rugby league team players
Sydney Roosters players
Newtown Jets NSW Cup players
Cabramatta Two Blues players
Living people
Rugby league props
Rugby league players from Sydney